Kevin R. Thiele is currently an adjunct associate professor at the University of Western Australia and the director of Taxonomy Australia. He was the curator of the Western Australian Herbarium from 2006 to 2015. His research interests include the systematics of the plant families Proteaceae, Rhamnaceae and Violaceae, and the conservation ecology of grassy woodland ecosystems. He also works in biodiversity informatics, developing and teaching  the development of interactive multi-access keys, and has been involved in the design of software for the Global Biodiversity Information Facility.

He obtained a PhD from the University of Melbourne in 1993, and has since published many papers, notably a treatment of the Rhamnaceae for the Flora of Australia series of monographs, and, with Pauline Ladiges, a taxonomic arrangement of Banksia. In 2007 he collaborated with Austin Mast to transfer Dryandra to Banksia. More recently, he has worked on pollination systems,  taxonomy,  vegetation dynamics, and described further new species.

He has contributed over 2000 images to Wikipedia Commons of Western Australian plants and weeds.

Selected recent publications

Some taxa authored by K.R.Thiele 

 Category:Taxa named by Kevin Thiele

References

External links

 Taxonomy Australia
Kevin Thiele Publications (UWA)

Botanists active in Australia
Botany in Western Australia
Living people
Scientists from Western Australia
1959 births